East Carnegie is a neighborhood located in the West End of Pittsburgh, Pennsylvania adjacent to the neighborhood of Oakwood. It is a "natural area" with large tracts of wooded land. 

Most of East Carnegie uses a post office zipcode of 15106, while a small part of this neighborhood uses a zipcode of 15205. Residents have representation on Pittsburgh City Council by the council member for District 2 (West Neighborhoods).

Surrounding neighborhoods
East Carnegie has four borders, including the Pittsburgh neighborhood of Oakwood to the northeast, Crafton to the north, Scott Township to the west and southwest, and Green Tree to the east and southeast.

See also
 List of Pittsburgh neighborhoods

References

Further reading

External links
Interactive Pittsburgh Neighborhoods Map

Neighborhoods in Pittsburgh